James Satalin (born November 18, 1943) is an American former college basketball coach and the current radio play-by-play announcer for Syracuse men's basketball. Satalin spent 16 seasons as a head coach for St. Bonaventure and Duquesne.

A native of Syracuse, New York, Satalin played college basketball at St. Bonaventure from 1965 to 1969. At the close of his college career, he was drafted by the Milwaukee Bucks in the ninth round (115th pick overall) of the 1969 NBA draft. Satalin turned to coaching in 1971, returning to his Alma mater as freshman basketball coach and varsity assistant to Larry Weise. When Weise resigned to focus on his duties as athletic director, Satalin was tapped as the Bonnies' new head coach. Satalin coached the Bonnies for nine seasons, winning one National Invitation Tournament (NIT) title in 1977 and making one NCAA tournament appearance the following season. He then moved to Duquesne in 1982.

Satalin inherited the Dukes' job with low expectations but guided the team to a 12–16 record with a number of surprisingly competitive games. At the close of his first season, he was named the Atlantic 10 Conference co-Coach of the Year with his replacement at St. Bonaventure, Jim O'Brien. The honor was to be the high point of Satalin's Duquesne tenure. He had six losing seasons in his seven years at the school and had a variety of off-season controversies. Ultimately, he was fired on March 8, 1989, with an overall record of 85–120 at Duquesne.

Following his coaching career, Satalin stayed close to college basketball. He oversaw officials with both the Big East Conference and Atlantic 10 and was national director of Coaches vs. Cancer. In 2013, he began doing radio play-by-play for Syracuse men's basketball.

References

External links
Coaching record @ sports-reference.com

1946 births
Living people
American men's basketball coaches
American men's basketball players
Basketball coaches from New York (state)
Basketball players from Syracuse, New York
College men's basketball head coaches in the United States
Duquesne Dukes men's basketball coaches
Guards (basketball)
Milwaukee Bucks draft picks
St. Bonaventure Bonnies men's basketball coaches
St. Bonaventure Bonnies men's basketball players
Syracuse Orange men's basketball announcers